The Pithlachascotee River, often called the Cotee or "Cootie" River, is a blackwater river in Pasco County, Florida.

A Florida State Canoe Trail runs along the river.

On a chart representing the west coast of Florida accompanying the annual report of the U.S. Coast Survey for 1851, the name is translated as "Boat Building River".  The whole word signifies the place where canoes were chopped or dug out.  The Seminole used canoes dug out of cypress trunks.  It is derived from the Creek pithlo (canoe), and chaskita (to chop out).

List of crossings

References 

FDOT Florida Bridge Data 01-05-2010
USGS Real-Time Water Data for USGS 02310300 PITHLACHASCOTEE RIVER NEAR NEW PORT RICHEY FL

External links 
 SWFWMD: Pithlachascotee River
 FDEP EcoSummary: Pithlachascotee River
 U.S. Army Corps of Engineers: Pithlachascotee River improvements

Rivers of Florida
Bodies of water of Pasco County, Florida